Abu Taher  (14 November 1938 – 21 July 1976) was a Bengali military serviceman, who served in the Pakistan Army, and later in BDF. He crossed into India around early August and reported to the Indian authorities. After a week screening at Dehradun, India, Taher reported to Kolkata, Bangladesh Provincial government at 8 Theatre Rd. He was ordered to report to Sector 11 of Mukti Bahini under command of Major Ziaur Rahman, he became the sector commander after him. He served in BDF from end of August to 2 November 1971. He was awarded the medal Bir Uttom for his gallantry in the liberation war. He was released from military service by Indian military medical board in Pune, India after his leg was amputated. After independence, he was inducted into the Bangladesh Army for administrative retirement with legacy rank of lieutenant colonel. After settling in with family, the government of Bangladesh appointed him with employment at Kumilla. Later Taher turned into a political activist and leader of the left-wing Jatiyo Samajtantrik Dal.

He was responsible for the 7 November coup which was 3rd Coup of 1975 of Bangladesh. After freeing Ziaur Rahman and reinstating him as army chief, many personnel including Taher was found guilty of high treason and murder and executed. However, in 2011, his trial was declared illegal by the high court of Bangladesh.

Early life and education
Abu Taher was born in Badarpur, Assam Province of British India on 14 November 1938. His ancestral village was Kazla in Purbadhala,  Netrokona District of Bangladesh. After the completion of higher secondary school from Murari Chand College in Sylhet, Taher joined the Pakistani Army in September 1960 as an officer candidate. He was married to Lutfa Taher.

Military career
Taher received his Commission in 1962 as a second lieutenant in the Pakistan Army. He joined the elite Pakistan Special Services Group (Commando Force) in 1965. Following his training, he participated in the Indo-Pakistani War of 1965 in the Sialkot sector of Kashmir. For his part, he received a war participation medal from the Pakistan Army. After the war, Taher took officers pre-qualification course on guerrilla warfare at Fort Benning in the United States in 1969. He was posted to the Quetta Staff College, Pakistan in 1970.

Bangladesh War of Independence
Towards the end of August 1971, Captain Taher, along with three other Bengali officers: Major Manzur, Major Ziauddin and Captain Bazlul Ghani Patwari defected from the Pakistani Army and crossed over the border near Abbottabad, West Pakistan, into India. After two weeks under Indian intelligence screening and debriefing, he was sent to Bangladesh Armed Forces (BDF) HQ at 8 Theatre Road, Calcutta and subsequently  posted to Sector 11. He was promoted to Major in September . Major Zia appointed Taher as Sub-Sector Commander No. 2 at Mahendraganj. Sector 11 was located across the Rangpur District, which comprised Mymensingh District, Tangail District and parts of the Rangpur District. On October 10, upon Major Zia's temporary transfer to the Sylhet sector, Major Shafayat Jamil handed over the interim command of the sector  to BDF. Sector 11. On 2 November 1971, Taher lost his leg from a small mine blast during a debriefing. Squadron Leader M. Hamidullah Khan was officially appointed Sector Commander of Sector 11 under direct orders through EAM from General Osmani, Bangladesh Interim Provincial Government Headquarters. Taher was flown to Pune, India. On 21 November Taher received a Medical Board Release. His leg was later amputated there, where he remained until February 1972. For his valour, he was awarded Bir Uttom.

Post-war activities
Following his return, Taher was reinstated into the Bangladesh Army in April for effective retirement following administrative procedure. He was retired with a legacy entitlement rank of Lieutenant Colonel and hence is widely known as Colonel Taher.

Jatiyo Samajtantrik Dal
Due to his left-leaning communist ideas of governance he joined the Jatiyo Samajtantrik Dal.

The Jatiyo Samajtantrik Dal had split from the Bangladesh Chhatra League, the student wing of the Bangladesh Awami League and called for establishing socialism through an armed revolution. Taher became the head of its armed wing, the Gonobahini and led a violent insurgency campaign against the government of Sheikh Mujibur Rahman.

15 August 1975 Coup
Abu Taher welcomed the assassination of Sheikh Mujibur Rahman on 15 August 1975, remarking,  They've made a big mistake. They shouldn't have allowed Sheikh Mujib's burial. Now a shrine will be built there. His body should have been thrown into the Bay of Bengal.   
It was known that Jatiyo Samajtantrik Dal had plans for an insurrection against Sheikh Mujib's government. After the 15 August coup, JSD encouraged its followers to study Marx's The Class Struggles in France. On the morning of the coup, Taher received several phone calls, urging him to go to Bangladesh Betar, the government radio station. Upon reaching the radio station, he met Major Rashid, one of the key organisers of Sheikh Mujib's assassination. Rashid took Taher to a room, where he saw Major Dalim, Taheruddin Thakur and Khondaker Mostaq Ahmad. Taher was invited to join the cabinet by Rashid, which he declined. Taher was present at Khondaker Mostaq Ahmad's swearing-in ceremony.

3 November 1975 Coup 
After the 15 August coup, the chain of command in the Bangladesh Army was disrupted, as the majors involved in Sheikh Mujib's assassination 'began acting like generals'. General Khaled Mosharraf urged General Ziaur Rahman to restore the chain of command, which he was either unwilling or unable to do. As a result, Khaled Mosharraf launced the 3 November coup, ousting Khondaker Mostaq Ahmad and placing Zia under house arrest. Right before Zia was arrested, he reportedly made a phone call to Taher, urging him to save him. Every night between 4 and 6 November, secret meetings of enlisted men and non-commissioned officers were held under Taher's leadership. These troops belonged to Biplobi Shainik Sangstha (Revolutionary Soldier's Organisation), which was a 'socialist and egalitarian' group which clandestinely existed within the Bangladesh Army. At these meetings, they finalised plans to organise an uprising of soldiers and civilians and free Zia from imprisonment.

7 November 1975 Coup 
The coup was launched during the early hours of 7 November in Dhaka Cantonment and soon spread to other areas, including Rangpur and Chittagong. Crowds poured into the streets of Dhaka to support the soldiers and shouted slogans, such as 'The people and soldiers have united'. Ziaur Rahman was freed from house arrest by soldiers and taken to the headquarters of the 2nd Field Artillery regiment, where he met Taher. Witnesses claim that Zia embraced Taher and thanked him for saving his life.

Trial and execution
Once Ziaur Rahman regained control of the army, he realized that the soldiers' mutiny had to be suppressed if discipline was to be restored. On 24 November 1975, he ordered Taher arrested on charges of high treason and murder. Taher was tried by a military tribunal inside the Dhaka Central Jail and sentenced to death on 17 July 1976. He was executed by hanging on 21 July 1976. His last meal consisted of mangoes and tea. The trial was later considered flawed.

High Court ruling
On 22 March 2011, the High Court overturned the previous judgement that authorised Taher's execution by a military tribunal while the nation was under martial law. The military court judgement was declared illegal. The court observed Taher's execution had happened according to Major General Zia's plan.

See also
 Bangladesh Forces

References

External links
 Website commemorating Col. Taher

1938 births
1976 deaths
Bangladesh Army colonels
Executed activists
People of the Bangladesh Liberation War
People from Netrokona District
People executed for treason against Bangladesh
Executed Bangladeshi people
20th-century executions for treason
Recipients of the Bir Uttom
People executed by Bangladesh by hanging
Mukti Bahini personnel
Jatiya Samajtantrik Dal politicians
Murari Chand College alumni
People from Karimganj district